Esports at the 2007 Asian Indoor Games was held in Macau East Asian Games Dome, Macau, China from 27 October to 30 October 2007. Three events FIFA 07, NBA Live 07 and Need for Speed: Most Wanted were held in the competition.

Medalists

Medal table

Results

FIFA 07

Preliminary
27–29 October

Knockout round

NBA Live 07

Preliminary
27–29 October

Knockout round

Need for Speed: Most Wanted

Preliminary
27–29 October

Knockout round

References
 2007 Asian Indoor Games official website

2007 Asian Indoor Games events
2007
2007 in esports